Lamprosema rakotalis is a species of moth of the family Crambidae described by Pierre Viette in 1958. It can be found in Madagascar.

Its wingspan is 21–22 mm, with a length of the forewings of 10-10.5 mm.

The holotype had been collected in western Madagascar, 45 km south of Morondava.

References 

Lamprosema
Moths described in 1958
Moths of Madagascar
Moths of Africa